Komsomolsk is the name of several inhabited localities in Russia.

Urban localities
Komsomolsk, Ivanovo Oblast, a town in Ivanovo Oblast
Komsomolsk, Kemerovo Oblast, an urban-type settlement in Tisulsky District of Kemerovo Oblast

Rural localities
Komsomolsk, Tomsk Oblast, a selo in Pervomaysky District of Tomsk Oblast
Komsomolsk, name of several other rural localities

See also
Komsomolsk-on-Amur, a city in Khabarovsk Krai